The Infantry Regiment "Saboya" No. 6 is a infantry unit of the Spanish Army, whose origins date back to 1633.

On 30 March 1633, a new Tercio of Savoy was created by dividing the existing Tercio of Lombardy; based in Cremona, the new unit consisted of 11 companies with a total of 109 officers and 1,200 men and remained in Italy until the War of the Spanish Succession, when it was transferred to Spain following the 1706 Convention of Milan. In 1707, by Royal Order of His Majesty Philip V of Spain, first Bourbon king of the Spanish Empire, it became a two battalion unit known as the Regiment of Savoy Nº 3.

Its first commander was Álvaro de Sande, first Marqués de la Piovera. The patron saint of the regiment was Our Lady of the Rosary.

Coat of arms
A white cross in red (gules) field. The shield, surrounded by the order of the Golden Fleece and surmounted by a royal crown. These arms are those of the Duchy of Savoy from which it took its name.

History 
It saw combat in Italy, Flanders and most European campaigns. In 1813 it was moved to America and fought in Mexico and in the Viceroyalty of the Río de la Plata. During the First Spanish Republic it was renamed 6th Infantry Regiment.

External links 
 6th Mechanized Infantry Regiment “Saboya”
 Infantry Memorial No. 33 of the Journal of the infantry by the Spanish Ministry of Defense
 Savoy Regiment History

References

Badajoz
Military history of Spain
Infantry regiments of Spain
Mechanized units and formations